Polyana is a rural locality (a settlement) in Tryokhprotoksky Selsoviet, Privolzhsky District, Astrakhan Oblast, Russia. The population was 48 as of 2010. There are 6 streets.

Geography 
Polyana is located 9 km southwest of Nachalovo (the district's administrative centre) by road. Tri Protoka is the nearest rural locality.

References 

Rural localities in Privolzhsky District, Astrakhan Oblast